Somatidia posticalis is a species of beetle in the family Cerambycidae. It was described by Broun in 1913.

References

posticalis
Beetles described in 1913